Grant Hill is an Australian film producer and unit production manager.

In 1999, he received an Academy Award for Best Picture nomination for The Thin Red Line, and again in 2012 for The Tree of Life.

He is known for his collaborations with director Terrence Malick and having been the line producer and unit production manager of all of the Wachowskis' films since The Matrix Reloaded, on which he was credited as an executive producer.

Filmography
He was a producer in all films unless otherwise noted.

Film

Production manager

Location management

Thanks

Television

Production manager

Location management

References

External links

Living people
Australian film producers
Year of birth missing (living people)
Unit production managers